Mira were an American five-piece dream pop/shoegaze band from Tallahassee, Florida, United States, formed in 1996.

History
Mira was formed by vocalist Regina Sosinski, guitarist Tom Parker, bassist Sam Riles and drummer Alan Donaldson. Originally called Still, they were influenced by shoegaze bands such as Slowdive and Cocteau Twins.

After releasing several EPs on their own Tesseract label, the band signed to Projekt Records, and their song "Cayman" appeared on Projekt's cat-themed 1999 compilation A Cat-Shaped Hole in My Heart.

Max Fresen replaced Riles, and the band added guitarist Mark Davidson.

Mira released their eponymous debut studio album on April 4, 2000.

For second album Apart, Melody Fleck replaced Fresen on bass, and the band toured the US.

In 2002, they collaborated on a self-released split single with Cream Abdul Babar, covering each other's songs.

Following 2005's There I Go Daydreamer, the band ceased activity and members moved on to other musical projects.

In 2011, Projekt released a compilation of rare and early Mira recordings, titled The Echo Lingers On (Demos, Outtakes and Rehearsals).

Other projects
Sosinski later formed Warm Orange with Paul Burdack.

Donaldson formed Florida shoegaze band Fantome, later succeeded by Book of the Chow Chow. He also played in Kid Hart.

Davidson played in Welcome to Nagaland and Done Beginner.

Discography

Studio albums
Mira (2000, Projekt)
Apart (2001, Projekt)
There I Go Daydreamer (2005, Projekt)

Singles and EPs
Something Ventured EP (1997, Tesseract)
Dry EP (1998, Tesseract)
Cowhausexclusive EP (1999, Tesseract)
The Space split 7-inch with Cream Abdul Babar (2002, self-released)
Pieces EP (2005, Projekt)

Compilation albums
The Echo Lingers On (Demos, Outtakes and Rehearsals) (2011, Projekt)

Compilation appearances
"Cayman" on A Cat-Shaped Hole in My Heart (1999, Projekt) 
"Divine" on Seireenia (2000, Projekt)

References

External links
Official Website

Dream pop musical groups
American ambient music groups
Musical groups from Tallahassee, Florida
Projekt Records artists
American shoegaze musical groups
Musical groups established in 1996
Musical groups disestablished in 2006